Windmill Redoubt was a redoubt in Żabbar, Malta. It was built by Maltese insurgents during the French blockade of 1798–1800. It was part of a chain of batteries, redoubts and entrenchments encircling the French positions in Marsamxett and the Grand Harbour.

The redoubt was built around a windmill known as Bir Għeliem, or Ta' Buleben, which had been built by Ramon Perellos y Roccaful in around 1710. The redoubt was located on the road between Żabbar and Tarxien, and was also linked to the road to Żejtun. The redoubt was built using rubble walls, and had a triangular shape, and was built in a way so as to block the roads between the three villages. The windmill occupied the south side of the redoubt, and was used as a blockhouse. The windmill's tower served as a lookout post. No details are known about the size of the garrison and the armament of the redoubt.

The Windmill Redoubt was probably demolished soon after the end of the blockade since it blocked important roads. The windmill itself still exists, with some modifications, and it now stands on the middle of a roundabout.

References

Redoubts in Malta
Windmills in Malta
Żabbar
Military installations established in 1798
Demolished buildings and structures in Malta
French occupation of Malta
Vernacular architecture in Malta
Limestone buildings in Malta
1798 establishments in Malta
18th-century fortifications
18th Century military history of Malta